The following lists events that happened during 1866 in New Zealand.

Incumbents

Regal and viceregal
Head of State — Queen Victoria
Governor — Sir George Grey

Government and law
The 1866 election is held between 12 February and 6 April. After the election the 4th Parliament commences.

Speaker of the House — David Monro is knighted during the year and becomes Sir David Monro.
Premier — Edward Stafford
Minister of Finance — William Fitzherbert replaces Francis Jollie on 24 August. Jollie had only replaced Edward Stafford on 12 June.
Chief Justice — Hon Sir George Arney

Main centre leaders
Mayor of Dunedin — William Mason

Events 
The Canterbury Standard ceases publication. The Christchurch newspaper started in 1854.
5 March: The Nelson Evening Mail publishes its first issue. The Mail was the first daily newspaper published in Nelson. It changed its name to The Nelson Mail in 1993, and continues to publish .
18 March: The Greymouth Evening Star publishes its first issue. The newspaper continues to publish .
21 April: The Marlborough Express publishes its first issue. It became daily in 1880, and continues to publish .
 May: The New Zealander stops publishing after its office burns down. The Auckland-based newspaper started publishing in 1845.
 26 August: The Cook Strait telegraph cable between Whites Bay, Marlborough and Lyall Bay, Wellington is inaugurated for inter-island telegrams.
 22 September: The Ross Guardian starts publication. The newspaper continued until 1879.
 12 October: The Battle of Omaranui takes place near Napier.

Sport

Horse racing

Major race winners
New Zealand Cup winner: Naurmahal
New Zealand Derby winner: Nebula

Rowing
The Union Rowing Club of Christchurch is formed.

Star Boating Club is established,  the oldest sporting club in Wellington.

Shooting
Ballinger Belt: Sergeant Christie (Otago)

Births
 1 April: William Blomfield, cartoonist (d. 1938)
 1 July: John Lillicrap, 29th Mayor of Invercargill.

Deaths
 20 August: Richard Barton, first European resident of Trentham, Upper Hutt (born 1790)
 14 November (in England): Charles Torlesse, prominent surveyor for the Canterbury Association (born 1825)
 9 December: Henry Monson, gaoler (born 1793)

See also
List of years in New Zealand
Timeline of New Zealand history
History of New Zealand
Military history of New Zealand
Timeline of the New Zealand environment
Timeline of New Zealand's links with Antarctica

References
General
 Romanos, J. (2001) New Zealand Sporting Records and Lists. Auckland: Hodder Moa Beckett. 

Specific

External links